John Douglas (died 25 June 1743) was an eminent lithotomist.

He was born one of the seven sons of William Douglas (d. 1705) of Baads, Edinburgh and his wife, Joan, daughter of James Mason of Park, Blantyre, and brother of Dr James Douglas, physician to the Queen.

He was for some time surgeon to the Westminster Infirmary. He was elected a Fellow of the Royal Society in 1720.

Writings 
He was the author of several medical controversial treatises, criticising the works of Chamberlain, Chapman, and Cheselden, most of which are now forgotten.

His book on lithotomy was translated into French in 1724.

References

Notes

1743 deaths
Medical doctors from Edinburgh
Scottish surgeons
Scottish medical writers
17th-century Scottish medical doctors
18th-century Scottish medical doctors
Fellows of the Royal Society
Year of birth unknown
Physicians of the Westminster Hospital